Tindal, Tindale or Tindall  may refer to:

People
 Adela Tindal (1862–1929), British composer, more usually known as Adela Maddison
 Bill Tindall (1925–1995), American aerospace engineer, NASA engineer and manager
 Blair Tindall (born 1960), American oboist and journalist
 George Tindall (1921–2006), American historian 
 Gillian Tindall (born 1938), British author
 Mardi Tindal (born 1952), Moderator of the United Church of Canada
 Mary Tindale (1920–2011), Australian botanist
 Matthew Tindal (1657–1733), English writer influential at the dawn of the Enlightenment
 Mike Tindall (born 1978), English rugby player
 Mike Tindall (footballer) (1941–2020), English football player
 Nicolas Tindal (1687–1774), 18th century translator and historian, nephew of Matthew
 Norman Tindale (1900–1993), Australian anthropologist, archaeologist and entomologist
 Nicholas Conyngham Tindal (1776–1846), English Lord Chief Justice of the Common Pleas (great grandson of Rev Nicolas).
 Patricia Randall Tindale (1926–2011), English architect and civil servant
 T.J. Tindall (1950–2016), American guitarist
 William Tindal (1756–1804), English antiquary
 William York Tindall (1903–1981), American James Joyce scholar at Columbia University
 Zara Tindall (born 1981), British royal and equestrian, otherwise known as Zara Phillips

Places
 RAAF Base Tindal, a Royal Australian Air Force base near Katherine, Northern Territory
 Tindale, Cumbria, England, United Kingdom
 Tindall, Missouri, United States
 Tindal, Northern Territory, Australia
 Tindall, Virginia, United States

Other uses
 Acetophenazine
 Tindal Centre, a defunct psychiatric hospital in Buckinghamshire, England
 Tindal Street Press, a British publisher
 The boatswain's mate or second most senior engine room petty officer in a lascar ship's crew

See also
 Tyndale (disambiguation), for Tyndale, Tyndall and Tynedale
 Tyndall (disambiguation)